Major-General Walter Fane  (1828–1885) was a British Indian Army officer who served in Central India, on the North West Frontier as well as in China during the Opium Wars. Fane raised a troop of irregular cavalry to fight in China made up of Indian volunteers and they went on to become Fane's Horse, a regiment that remains part of Pakistan's armed forces.

Life
Walter Fane, a member of the Fane family, was born in 1828 in Fulbeck Lincolnshire. He was the son of the Rev. Edward Fane of Fulbeck Hall.

Army career
He entered the army in 1845 and became a lieutenant in 1853. He served in the Punjab Irregular Cavalry on the North West frontier where they fought a number engagements against the hill tribes.

During the Indian Rebellion Fane fought against Tantya Tope and he was present when the Indian rebel leader was captured and executed.

In 1860 Fane raised the irregular cavalry force of Fane's Horse to fight in China during the Second Opium War. Fane's horse fought in the engagements of Sinho, Chinkiawbaw, Pulli-chi-on as well as in the sacking of Peking under Fane's cousin Field Marshal Sir John Michel. For these services, he was nominated as a Companion of the Order of the Bath.

Later life
Fane was also an artist and had limited success throughout his lifetime, and he was the most successful member of a moderately artistic family. He married but had no children and he died aged 58 in Fulbeck where is buried.

References

1828 births
1885 deaths
British East India Company Army officers
British Indian Army generals
Walter
Companions of the Order of the Bath
British military personnel of the Indian Rebellion of 1857
British military personnel of the Second Opium War
People from South Kesteven District
Military personnel from Lincolnshire